Jon-Erik Kellso (born May 8, 1964, Dearborn, Michigan) is an American jazz trumpeter and session musician.

Kellso began playing jazz music very young in life, and also received some formal training in classical idioms.

Some of the jazz musicians he has performed and/or recorded with include J.C. Heard, Catherine Russell, Cecile McLorin Salvant, Kat Edmonson, James Dapogny, Milt Hinton, Rick Fay, Ralph Sutton, Ruby Braff, Marty Grosz, Bob Haggart, Dick Hyman, Wynton Marsalis, Ken Peplowski, Bucky Pizzarelli, Dan Barrett, Bob Wilber, Howard Alden, Wycliffe Gordon, and Kenny Davern. He has also played and recorded with Linda Ronstadt, Leon Redbone, Maria Muldaur, Levon Helm, Elvis Costello, Dave Van Ronk, and many others, appearing on over one hundred records.

He moved from Detroit to New York City in 1989 to join Vince Giordano and the Nighthawks, with whom he has recorded many movie and TV soundtracks, including the Grammy Award-winning soundtrack for Boardwalk Empire, The Aviator, Bessie, Ghost World, and Revolutionary Road.

Kellso has led The “EarRegulars” at the historic Ear Inn in Manhattan on Sunday nights since 2007, with whom he has recorded two acclaimed albums.

Discography

As leader
 Chapter I (Arbors, 1993)
 Chapter Two: The Plot Thickens (Arbors, 1997)
 Kellso's BC Buddies (gen-Erik, 2005)
 Blue Roof Blues: A Love Letter to New Orleans (Arbors, 2007)
 Remembering Ruby (gen-Erik, 2007)
 The EarRegulars (gen-Erik, 2014)
 In the Land of Beginning Again (Jazzology, 2015)
 Sweet Fruits Salty Roots (Jazzology, 2020)

References
Monk Rowe, "Jon-Erik Kellso". The New Grove Dictionary of Jazz. 2nd edition, ed. Barry Kernfeld.

External links

 KellsoJazz - website

American jazz trumpeters
American male trumpeters
Musicians from Michigan
Jazz musicians from Michigan
1964 births
Living people
21st-century trumpeters
21st-century American male musicians
American male jazz musicians
Arbors Records artists
Jazzology Records artists